St Michael & All Angels Church is an Anglican parish church in Pelsall, West Midlands, England. It was built in 1844 to replace an older church on Paradise Lane and was fully completed with its bell tower in 1889. The Deans of Wolverhampton were also vicars at the church until 1846 when the church came under the ecclesiastical district of Pelsall. The churchyard also has a memorial to the 1872 Pelsall Hall Colliery disaster when 22 miners died when the pit was flooded by a sudden rush of water. The Bishop of Lichfield and the village paid tribute to the miners and had a memorial erected at St Michael and All Angels Churchyard in tribute to the miners who died. The church sits at the junction of Hall Lane and Church Road. The church is within the "Pelsall Common" conservation area and although not a listed building it plays an important role as a church for the local community and its church hall is used by the local community.

References

Churches completed in 1844
Walsall, St Matthew
Buildings and structures in Walsall